Drei Damen vom Grill was a German television series aired from 1978 to 1992 in Germany's public television  ARD.

The series revolved around the Färber family (Margarete, Magda and Margot Färber) running a snack bar in West Berlin. The  show not only depicts their lives and work, but also reflects the division of Berlin and later the German Reunification.

The series aired in Australia for many years on Special Broadcasting Service, titled as "Three Ladies And Their Hot Dog Stand". Episodes were shown in the original German version, but with English subtitles.

There also Aired in France Called "Les aventures de trois filles au grill" on FR3 in the original German with French subtitles.

In Portugal Will Be Aired Called "3 Garotas na Terra da Salsicha" on Channel 2 in the original German with that subtitles.

Cast 
 Brigitte Mira as Margarete Färber
 Brigitte Grothum as Magda Färber / Marion Mann
 Gabriele Schramm as Margot Färber
 Günter Pfitzmann as Otto Krüger
 Harald Juhnke as Ottmar Kinkel

External links
 

1980s German television series
1978 German television series debuts
1992 German television series endings
Television shows set in Berlin
German-language television shows
Das Erste original programming